Gol Darreh, Lorestan may refer to:

 Gol Darreh, Delfan
 Gol Darreh, Khorramabad